Alexander Stevenson (30 October 1885 – 23 April 1963) was a Scotland international rugby union player. He played at the Forward position.

Rugby Union career

Amateur career

Stevenson played for Glasgow University RFC.

Provincial career

Stevenson played in the Inter-City match on 3 December 1910 for Glasgow District against Edinburgh District.

He played for the Blues Trial side against the Whites Trial side on 21 January 1911 while still with Glasgow University.

International career

Stevenson was capped by Scotland for just one match. This was the Five Nations match against France on 2 January 1911. France won the match 16 - 15.

References

1885 births
1963 deaths
Scottish rugby union players
Glasgow University RFC players
Scotland international rugby union players
Glasgow District (rugby union) players
Blues Trial players
Rugby union players from Glasgow
Rugby union forwards